The Custom Flight Lite Star, or Light Star, is a Canadian amateur-built and light-sport aircraft, designed and produced by Custom Flight of Tiny, Ontario. The aircraft is supplied as a kit for amateur construction or complete ready-to-fly.

Design and development

The aircraft fuselage is made from welded 4130 steel tubing, with the wing constructed from aluminum sheet, with its flying surfaces covered in doped aircraft fabric. The wing is supported by "V"-struts and jury struts. Construction time from the supplied kit is 400 hours.

Operational history
By December 2016 two examples had been registered with Transport Canada as Light Stars.

As of December 2016, the design does not appear on the Federal Aviation Administration's list of approved special light-sport aircraft.

Specifications (Lite Star)

References

External links

Homebuilt aircraft
Single-engined tractor aircraft
Custom Flight aircraft